Claude Frioux (12 January 1932 – April 17, 2017) was a French academic specializing in Russia.

A Normalien, agrégé de russe, sovietologist, he was a lecturer at the faculté de lettres de Rennes before becoming professor emeritus at the Université de Paris VIII (« Vincennes à Saint-Denis ») which he chaired from its inception in 1971 until 1976 and from 1981 to 1986. He has often led translation projects, especially with Elsa Triolet on Anton Chekhov and his wife Irène Sokologorsky. As a translator, he has worked on about thirty books and is best known as the reference translator for the poet Vladimir Mayakovsky.

Selected bibliography 
2008: Trois correspondances, Paris, L'Harmattan. 
1969: Vladimir Maïakovski, Lettres à Lili Brik (1917-1930), trans. Andrée Robel, presentation by Claude Frioux, Éditions Gallimard
1984: Vladimir Maïakovski, Poèmes 1913-1917, trans. Claude Frioux, Messidor
1985: Vladimir Maïakovski, Poèmes 1918-1921, trans. Claude Frioux, Messidor
1986: Vladimir Maïakovski, Poèmes 1922-1923, trans. Claude Frioux, Messidor
1987: Vladimir Maïakovski, Poèmes 1924-1930, trans. Claude Frioux, Messidor
 Vie et œuvre de Youri Solntsev, Paris, L'Harmattan, series "Poètes des cinq continents"
 L'URSS et nous (dir.), Paris.
1961: Maïakovski par lui-même, Éditions du Seuil, series "Écrivains de toujours", Paris
 Tchekhov Anton, Œuvres : Introduction, chronologie et table alphabétique des récits dans les trois tomes. Gallimard, series Bibliothèque de la Pléiade.

External links 
 Le purgatoire des intellectuels russes on Le Monde diplomatique, November 1998
 Le destin poétique de Marina Cvetaeva (compte rendu) on Persée
 Claude Frioux on Sens critique

1932 births
2017 deaths
École Normale Supérieure alumni
Academic staff of the University of Rennes
Russian–French translators
20th-century translators
Academic staff of Paris 8 University Vincennes-Saint-Denis